Ressia quercidentella is a moth in the family Cosmopterigidae. It is found in China (Henan, Tianjin), Korea and the Russian Far East.

The wingspan is 10–11.5 mm.

References

Natural History Museum Lepidoptera generic names catalog

Cosmopteriginae